Hellfest was an American all-ages music festival that existed between 1997 and 2005. The festival showcased hardcore music in its broadest sense, including punk rock, metalcore, emo, post-hardcore and more. It originated in Central New York, in and around Syracuse, but eventually relocated to Central New Jersey during its final years. Hellfest was known for its fan-friendly atmosphere, including a lack of barriers that provided easy access to the stage for stage diving and sing-alongs. It also encouraged social-awareness through workshops that discussed such causes as animal rights, LGBTQ and politics, with many of its bands and attendees following straight-edge and/or vegetarian or vegan lifestyles.

Not unlike many festivals of its size, Hellfest encountered several problems, notably the changing venues mere days before starting. This was the case for 1999's Syracuse Hell Fest 99, 2000's Hellfest 2K, 2001's Hellfest 2001 and 2005's Hellfest '05. The relocation caused an entire day to be missed of the 2000 edition, while the 2005 edition was cancelled altogether. The considerable financial dilemma that resulted from the 2005 event's cancellation led to the termination of the festival.

History and etymology 
Co-promoter Josh Grabelle, who was also a sponsor of the festival through his record label Trustkill Records, claimed in 2001 that the event was named Hellfest because "This festival has always been the first weekend in July and it is always extremely HOT, hence, the reference to the blazing inferno known as Hell". This explanation, though inaccurate, has since become de facto, even though Grabelle was not involved with the early years of the festival.

The factual reason behind the naming of the festival was linked to founding promoter Keith Allen's concert booking agency, Hardcore As Hell. Allen and his partner Ryan Canavan had been booking and promoting concerts in the Syracuse, New York area since 1996. Canavan also had his own booking agency, Hanging Like A Hex, which gave name to a fanzine that he published and, later, the record label Hex Records. Canavan's fanzine Hanging Like a Hex published the first festival's guide/pamphlet as issue number 7.5. Allen and Canavan co-booked the first three festivals: the first event in 1997 was promoted as Syracuse 3-Day Super Festival; the two events in 1998 were promoted as Syracuse Hardcore Festival and Syracuse Hardcore Festival 2.5. It was only with the fourth event in 1999, once Allen became sole promoter, that the word hell was added to the name and the event was promoted as Syracuse Hell Fest 99. The single-word Hellfest was first used for the 2000 edition as Hellfest 2K. Allen was also keen on booking his own bands (Order of Deceit, The August Prophecy, Found Dead Hanging and Architect) in favorable time slots.

For Hellfest 2004, Allen relocated the festival from New York to New Jersey, forming a new partnership corporation. Paper Street Music Co. LLC was co-founded by Allen, Shawn Van Der Poel and Heath Miller and was based in Mount Holly, New Jersey.

Hellfest lineups by year

June 20–22, 1997: Syracuse 3-Day Super Festival 
Location: Hungry Charley's, 727 South Crouse Avenue, Syracuse, New York.

Friday, June 20 

 454 Big Block
 Cast Iron Hike
 Dirge
 Dissolve
 Snapcase
 Sweetbelly Freakdown
 Ten Yard Fight

Saturday, June 21 

 Beta Minus Mechanic
 Bird of Ill Omen
 Burial Ground
 Coalesce
 Culture
 Handful of Dust
 Indecision
 Lockjaw
 Morning Again
 Order of Deceit
 Silent Majority
 Today Is the Day

Sunday, June 22 

 Another Victim
 Ascension
 Birthright
 Culture *
 Day of Suffering
 Despair
 Drowning Room
 Endeavor
 Frodus
 Ground Zero
 Hatebreed
 One to Face
 Tread

Notes 
* Culture performed their regular set on June 21, then played a 1-song set on June 22 using Hatebreed's gear.

The Earth Crisis side-project Brown Stars was scheduled to make a special, unlisted appearance on Sunday, June 22, but backed out the day before, leading local band Tread to be added to the line-up.

June 13–14, 1998: Syracuse Hardcore Festival 
Location: Cornell Cooperative Extension, 248 Grant Avenue, Auburn, New York.

Saturday, June 13 

 Anal Cunt
 Boysetsfire
 Break of Dawn
 Buried Alive
 Dissolve
 Dragbody
 Holdstrong
 Overcast
 Quioxte
 Shutdown
 Still Bleeding
 The Trans Megetti
 Turmoil

Sunday, June 14 

 6 Going on 7
 Brother's Keeper
 Cave In
 Coalesce
 Creation Is Crucifixion
 Defect
 The Dillinger Escape Plan
 Disembodied
 Errortype: Eleven
 Human Shield
 Kerosene 454
 Morning Again
 NORA
 Racetraitor
 Set in Motion
 SeventyEightDays
 Snapcase
 Thoughts of Ionesco
 Torn Apart

December 5–6, 1998: Syracuse Hardcore Festival 2.5 
Location: The Lost Horizon, 5863 Thompson Road, Syracuse, New York.

Saturday, December 5 

 Acacia
 Ascension
 All Else Failed
 Cave In
 Creation Is Crucifixion
 Crossthread
 Dead Eyes Under
 The Grey A.M.
 Ground Zero
 Motive
 The Passenger Train Proposal
 Piebald
 Shadows Fall
 Skycamefalling

Sunday, December 6 

 Alabama Thunder Pussy
 Burn it Down
 Burn the Priest
 Disembodied
 Drowningman
 For the Love of...
 God Forbid
 Good Clean Fun
 Indecision
 Isis
 Jesuit
 NORA
 Racetraitor

Notes 
This was the only time that the festival held an event during the autumn.

June 26–27, 1999: Syracuse Hell Fest 99 
Location: The Lost Horizon, 5863 Thompson Road, Syracuse, New York.

Saturday, June 26 

 As Friends Rust
 Boysetsfire
 Buried Alive
 Creation Is Crucifixion
 Eternal Youth
 Fastbreak
 NORA
 Reach the Sky
 Since the Fall
 Snapcase
 Standfast
 Ten Yard Fight
 Where Fear and Weapons Meet

Sunday, June 27 

 Another Victim
 Break of Dawn
 Brother's Keeper
 Disembodied
 Drowningman
 Fallout
 Glasseater
 Good Clean Fun
 Grade *
 Grey Area
 The Judas Factor
 Spread the Disease

Notes 
* Grade were scheduled to play but did not due to an incident with a taser.

The following bands may have also played: Eighteen Visions, Fall Silent, Kid Dynamite, Kill the Slave Master, One King Down and Racetraitor.

Originally scheduled to take place at Another Level, 727 South Crouse Avenue, but it was moved to The Lost Horizon.

June 30–July 2, 2000: Hellfest 2K 
Locations: The Lost Horizon, 5863 Thompson Road, Syracuse, New York / Club Mirage, 6815 Manlius Center Road, East Syracuse, New York.

Friday, June 30 * 

 As Friends Rust
 Burn It Down
 Candiria
 Codeseven
 Creation Is Crucifixion
 The Dillinger Escape Plan
 Disciple
 Dissolve
 Drowningman
 Ensign
 Godbelow
 Gunmen and Flightpaths
 Isis
 The Juliana Theory
 Kill Your Idols
 Maharahj
 The National Acrobat
 NORA
 Zao

Saturday, July 1 

 Adamantium
 Bane
 The August Prophecy
 Bane
 Beyond Fall
 Bloodjinn
 Buried Alive
 Cave In
 Converge
 Death by Stereo
 Dragbody
 Eighteen Visions
 Glasseater
 Good Clean Fun
 Head On
 Idle Hands
 Killswitch Engage
 Mid Carson July
 Prayer for Cleansing
 Reach the Sky
 Red Roses for a Blue Lady
 Time in Malta
 Walls of Jericho

Sunday, July 2 

 All Else Failed
 Anodyne
 Brother's Keeper
 Crucible
 Destro
 Diecast
 Every Time I Die
 The Grey A.M.
 The Hope Conspiracy
 New Day Rising
 One King Down
 Poison the Well
 Shai Hulud
 Spark Lights the Friction
 Spitfire
 Starkweather
 This Day Forward
 Throwdown
 Turmoil
 Twelve Tribes

Notes 
* The festival was initially scheduled to take place at the Booker T. Washington Community Center in Auburn, New York. On Thursday, June 29, the city of Auburn objected to the festival taking place so the organizers secured a second venue near Syracuse Hancock International Airport in Syracuse, New York. On the morning of Friday, June 30, the fire department objected to the festival because it was too close to the airport. The event was moved again to The Lost Horizon but this time the city of Syracuse objected to the festival taking place. The bands and record labels set up a hardcore flea market in the parking lot of The Lost Horizon to sell merchandise, meanwhile Maharahj and Creation Is Crucifixion performed in a local girl named Emily's front yard down the street. The organizers spent the day finding a new venue and re-booking most of the bands from Friday, June 30 into the next two days. The Saturday, July 1 and Sunday, July 2 shows took place at Club Mirage in East Syracuse.

July 6–8, 2001: Hellfest 2001 
Location: Action Sports & Skate Center, 2299 Brewerton Road, in Mattydale, New York

Friday, July 6

Main Stage 

 Eighteen Visions
 Ensign
 Every Time I Die
 Glasseater
 Godbelow
 Good Clean Fun
 Just Passed
 Locked in a Vacancy
 Long Since Forgotten
 Martyr A.D.
 Poison the Well
 Santa Sangre
 Spark Lights the Friction
 This Day Forward
 Throwdown
 Trouble Loves Me
 Walls of Jericho

Second Stage 

 A Death for Every Sin
 All Else Failed
 Anodyne
 Arma Angelus
 Arms Length
 The Bluestardiary
 Building on Fire
 Cataract
 Ebony Sorrow
 Embrace Today
 Fairweather
 From Autumn to Ashes
 In Pieces
 Jeromes Dream
 Kalibas
 Keelhaul
 One Nation Under
 Miles Between Us

Saturday, July 7

Main Stage 

 American Hot Wax
 Another Victim
 Brother's Keeper
 Burn It Down
 Burnt by the Sun
 Course of Action
 Ground Zero
 Lamb of God
 Lariat
 Length of Time
 Most Precious Blood
 NORA
 One King Down
 Open Hand
 Reach the Sky
 Remembering Never
 Shai Hulud
 Stretch Arm Strong
 Thursday
 Until the End

Second Stage 

 Cipher
 Curl Up and Die
 Destro
 The Disaster
 The Grey A.M.
 Holy Angels
 Inkling
 Mastodon
 Mid Carson July
 Pig Destroyer
 Premonitions of War
 Ruined in a Day
 Saving Throw
 Season of Fire
 Standfast

Sunday, July 8

Main Stage 

 Arkangel
 Cable
 Candiria
 Catastrophic
 Diecast
 Earth Crisis
 Hatebreed
 If Hope Dies
 In Dying Days
 Killswitch Engage
 Skycamefalling
 Spitfire
 Twelve Tribes
 Undying
 Unearth
 Zao

Second Stage 

 A Jealousy Issue
 The August Prophecy
 Beyond Fall
 Bleeding Through
 Blood Has Been Shed
 Bloodjinn
 Circle of Dead Children
 Craig
 Darker Day Tomorrow
 Dead Limb Sleep
 FaceDown
 Garrison
 Harakiri
 Maharahj
 Stalemate
 Sworn Enemy
 Upheaval
 When Dreams Die
 Wrong the Oppressor

Notes 
The festival was originally booked and announced to take place at Action Sports & Skate Center, 2299 Brewerton Road, in Mattydale, New York. However, on June 19, 2001, less than three weeks before the event, the promoters moved the show to Liquids in East Syracuse. In a sleight-of-hand trick, attendees arriving at Liquids on the morning of July 6 were greeted with flyers stating "It wouldn't be Hellfest without drama," with directions back to the Mattydale Action Sports & Skate Center, the true location of the festival.

The 2001 edition was the first to feature two stages.

July 12–14, 2002: Hellfest 2002 
Location: New York State Fairgrounds, 581 State Fair Boulevard, Syracuse, New York.

Friday, July 12

Main Stage 

 Atreyu
 Bane
 Bloodlet
 Diecast
 The Dillinger Escape Plan
 Every Time I Die
 God Forbid
 Hopesfall
 Nemesis
 NORA
 Norma Jean
 On the Might of Princes

B Stage 

 A Life Once Lost
 Between the Buried and Me
 Building on Fire
 Endicott
 In Pieces
 The June Spirit
 Killswitch Engage
 Love Is Red
 Open Hand
 Season of Fire
 Taken
 Your Enemies Friends

C Stage 

 7 Angels 7 Plagues
 American Tragedy
 As Hope Dies
 Breaking Pangaea
 Bury Your Dead
 Codeseven
 Dead to Fall
 Glasseater
 Long Since Forgotten
 Moneen
 Not Waving but Drowning
 This Day Forward
 Uphill Battle

Saturday, July 13

Main Stage 

 All Else Failed
 American Nightmare
 Caliban
 Camp Kill Yourself
 From Autumn to Ashes
 The Hope Conspiracy
 Misfits
 Reach the Sky
 Shai Hulud
 Stretch Arm Strong
 Skycamefalling
 Unearth

B Stage 

 Bleeding Through
 Burnt by the Sun
 Coheed and Cambria
 Count the Stars
 Evergreen Terrace
 Face the Facts
 Found Dead Hanging
 If Hope Dies
 The Last Season
 The Red Chord
 The Rise
 Terror
 The Year of Our Lord

C Stage 

 Avenged Sevenfold
 Burning Bridges
 Ed Gein
 Eiffel
 Himsa
 Knives Out
 The Minor Times
 One Fifth
 Remembering Never
 Saving Throw
 This Afternoon
 Twelve Tribes
 Until the End

Sunday, July 14

Main Stage 

 Asherah
 Cro-Mags
 Curl Up and Die
 xDisciplex A.D.
 Eighteen Visions
 Ensign
 Hatebreed
 Lamb of God
 Merauder
 Most Precious Blood
 The Promise
 Throwdown

B Stage 

 A Static Lullaby
 The Black Dahlia Murder
 Brandtson
 Commit Suicide
 Death Threat
 Kalibas
 One Nation Under
 Shattered Realm
 Suicide Note
 Time in Malta
 Undying
 The Wage of Sin
 What Feeds the Fire

C Stage 

 A Death for Every Sin
 The Blood Brothers
 Blood Has Been Shed
 The Cancer Conspiracy
 Circle of Dead Children
 Dead Wrong
 Harakiri
 Homesick for Space
 Lickgoldensky
 Light Is the Language
 Martyr A.D.
 Ringworm
 Sworn Enemy

Notes 
The 2002 edition was the first to feature three stages.

July 4–6, 2003: Hellfest 2K3
Location: New York State Fairgrounds, 581 State Fair Boulevard, Syracuse, New York / Planet 505, 505 Westcott Street, Syracuse, New York.

Friday, July 4

Stage A 

 As I Lay Dying
 Blood Has Been Shed
 Chimaira
 Curl Up and Die
 Kittie
 Lamb of God
 Majority Rule
 Misery Signals
 Soilwork
 Undying
 Unearth

Stage B 

 A Life Once Lost
 Anti-Flag
 Biohazard
 Darkest Hour
 Ed Gein
 Found Dead Hanging
 Himsa
 In Flames
 The Red Chord
 Walls of Jericho

Stage C 

 A Perfect Murder
 Acacia
 Alexisonfire
 Cannae
 The Devil's Discipline
 Forever Yours
 Full Blown Chaos
 Kid Gorgeous
 On the Might of Princes
 Premonitions of War
 Suicide Note
 Tabula Rasa
 The Vacancy
 This Afternoon

After Party 

 The Black Dahlia Murder
 Bodies in the Gears of the Apparatus
 Deadwater Drowning
 From a Second Story Window

Saturday, July 5

Stage A 

 A Static Lullaby
 Acceptance
 The A.K.A.s
 Bleeding Through
 The Bouncing Souls
 Dead Poetic
 Death Threat
 Further Seems Forever
 No Warning
 Onelinedrawing
 Thursday

Stage B 

 Autopilot Off
 xDisciplex A.D.
 From Autumn to Ashes
 The Hope Conspiracy
 The Movielife
 My Chemical Romance
 Shai Hulud
 The Suicide File
 Terror
 Until the End

Stage C 

 Albert React
 Anberlin
 Champion
 Days in Vain
 Dead to Fall
 Embrace Today
 Fire When Ready
 First Blood
 Jude the Obscure
 Love Is Red
 Murder by Death
 Spitalfield
 Stand and Fight
 This Day Forward

After Party 

 A Fall Farewell
 If Hope Dies
 Scars of Tomorrow
 Taken

Sunday, July 6

Stage A 

 Brother's Keeper
 CKY
 Converge
 Every Time I Die
 Figure Four
 Freya
 Norma Jean
 Remembering Never
 Stretch Arm Strong
 The Takeover

Stage B 

 Armor for Sleep
 Beloved
 The Dillinger Escape Plan
 Evergreen Terrace
 Hopesfall
 In Pieces
 The Locust
 NORA
 Skycamefalling
 Underoath

Stage C 

 ArmsBendBack
 As Hope Dies
 Asherah
 The Bled
 The Break
 Comeback Kid
 Daughters
 Marrakech
 Merciana
 On Broken Wings
 Scarlet
 Sinai Beach
 Tokyo
 With Honor

Notes 
The 2003 edition was the first to have official after-party concerts, which were held at Planet 505 in Syracuse on the first two nights. It was the last event to be held in New York; the festival would move to New Jersey for its final two years.

July 23–25, 2004: Hellfest 2004 
Location: RexPlex, 2 Ikea Drive, Elizabeth, New Jersey.

Friday, July 23

Main Stage 

 The A.K.A.s
 All Else Failed
 As I Lay Dying
 The Ataris
 Champion
 Draw Blood
 Every Time I Die
 Folly
 Found Dead Hanging
 Halifax
 Himsa
 The Juliana Theory
 Mastodon
 Misfits
 Norma Jean
 The Red Chord
 Remembering Never
 Sick of It All
 Shadows Fall
 Spitalfield
 Strike Anywhere
 Suffocation
 Terror
 Unearth

Hot Topic Stage 

 Adelphi
 All That Remains
 Anterrabae
 Bigwig
 Broke Neck
 Burnt by the Sun
 Day of Contempt
 Engineer
 Ensign
 Glasseater
 Hawthorne Heights
 Pig Destroyer
 Premonitions of War
 Sycamore Dreams
 Today Is the Day
 Your Enemies Friends

Dinosaur Stage 

 100 Demons
 The Calico System
 The Dead Season
 Ed Gein
 Full Blown Chaos
 Nag Hamadi
 The Oval Portrait
 Saving Throw
 Starting to Wonder
 Through the Discipline
 Time in Malta
 Walk the Line
 With Honor

Saturday, July 24

Main Stage 

 Agnostic Front
 Andrew W.K.
 Avail
 Bane
 The Banner
 Blood for Blood
 Bury Your Dead
 Caliban
 E-Town Concrete
 Evergreen Terrace
 The Hope Conspiracy
 The Killing
 Killswitch Engage
 Love Is Red
 Martyr A.D.
 Mest
 No Hollywood Ending
 NORA
 Odd Project
 Roses Are Red
 Scars of Tomorrow
 Shattered Realm
 Stretch Arm Strong
 Underoath
 Until the End
 Zao

Hot Topic Stage 

 Beloved
 Between the Buried and Me
 Blacklisted
 Comeback Kid
 DRI
 Drive Without
 Drowningman
 Embrace Today
 For the Love of...
 Horse the Band
 Let it Die
 No Redeeming Social Value
 Nothing Left to Mourn
 Prayer for Cleansing
 The World/Inferno Friendship Society

Dinosaur Stage 

 Dead to Fall
 xDEATHSTARx
 Figure Four
 The Judas Cradle
 Malice Aforethought
 The Minor Times
 Misery Index
 Only Crime
 Park
 Reflux
 Suffocate Faster
 To the Grave
 Undying

Sunday, July 25

Main Stage 

 A Thousand Falling Skies
 Alexisonfire
 Bear vs. Shark
 Bleeding Through
 Cannae
 Converge
 Death by Stereo
 Death Threat
 The Dillinger Escape Plan
 Fear Factory
 Fordirelifesake
 If Hope Dies
 It Dies Today
 Life of Agony
 Most Precious Blood
 Shai Hulud
 Sworn Enemy
 Throwdown
 Walls of Jericho

Hot Topic Stage 

 25 Ta Life
 A Life Once Lost
 A Perfect Murder
 Bad Luck 13 Riot Extravaganza
 Breath of Silence
 The Bronx
 Endwell
 Fear Before the March of Flames
 From a Second Story Window
 Merauder
 Misery Signals
 Planes Mistaken for Stars
 The Promise
 Stars Turn Cold
 Zombie Apocalypse

Dinosaur Stage 

 The Acacia Strain
 The Autumn Offering
 Drive By
 Dry Kill Logic
 Flat Earth Society
 Forever Is Forgotten
 Last Perfection
 Psyopus
 Stabbed by Words
 Wings of Scarlet
 With Dead Hands Rising

Notes 
The 2004 edition was the first edition to be held in New Jersey. In addition to the concerts, the RexPlex offered a skate park, indoor paintball, arcades, laser tag and the Hellfest Tattoo Festival.

August 19–21, 2005: Hellfest '05 
Location: Sovereign Bank Arena, 81 Hamilton Avenue, Trenton, New Jersey.

Friday, August 19 *

Main Stage A: 1x1 Music 

 All That Remains
 Architect
 Cryptopsy
 Hatebreed
 Killing Time
 Madball
 Scars of Tomorrow
 Sick of it All
 Unearth
 The Warriors

Main Stage B: Peta2 

 Chimaira
 Converge
 He Is Legend
 Misfits
 Nile
 Suffocation
 Turmoil
 With Honor
 Zao

Outdoor Stage A: Goodfellow Records/Abacus Recordings 

 All Else Failed
 Curl Up and Die
 Donnybrook
 Doomriders
 Ed Gein
 Embrace the End
 Embrace Today
 From a Second Story Window
 Full Blown Chaos
 Modern Life Is War
 Shattered Realm
 Winter Solstice

Outdoor Stage B: Eulogy Recordings 

 100 Demons
 3 Inches of Blood
 A Wilhelm Scream
 Betrayed
 Buried Inside
 Cursed
 Dead to Fall
 God Forbid
 If Hope Dies
 The Minor Times
 Six Feet Under
 Sworn Enemy

Outdoor Stage C: Hot Topic 

 Alove For Enemies
 Animosity
 Arms Race
 Cancer Bats
 Cannae
 Demiricous
 Fixer
 Ghosts of War
 Kids Like Us
 The Killing
 Nine Will Die
 No Redeeming Social Value
 Nobody Left Behind
 Nodes of Ranvier
 Rumplestiltskin Grinder
 Seventh Star
 Stemm
 Stray from the Path
 Summer's End
 This Is Hell

Saturday, August 20 *

Main Stage A: 1x1 Music 

 108
 Bold
 The Bouncing Souls
 Champion
 Coalesce
 Marathon
 Mean Season
 NORA
 Public Enemy
 Strike Anywhere

Main Stage B: Peta2 

 Against Me!
 BoySetsFire
 Evergreen Terrace
 Good Clean Fun
 Lifetime
 None More Black
 Outspoken
 Terror
 The Unseen

Outdoor Stage A: Goodfellow Records/Abacus Recordings 

 As Cities Burn
 Blacklisted
 Classic Case
 Ensign
 Fall River
 The Jonbenét
 Long Since Forgotten
 Most Precious Blood
 Paint it Black
 The Secret
 Suffocate Faster
 Triple Threat

Outdoor Stage B: Eulogy Recordings 

 Fire When Ready
 Gym Class Heroes
 Hidden in Plain View
 Hit the Lights
 Houston Calls
 Over It
 Planes Mistaken for Stars
 Misery Signals
 New Atlantic
 Since the Flood
 Smoke or Fire
 Spitalfield

Outdoor Stage C: Hot Topic 

 Above this Fire
 Anorexic Beauty Queen
 Backstabbers Incorporated
 Burning Season
 Casey Jones
 Colin of Arabia
 Dead Hearts
 The Fire Still Burns
 Glass and Ashes
 One Dead Three Wounded
 Manntis
 MC Goldie Wilson
 Mikoto
 North Side Kings
 Ready Set Fail
 Sons of Azrael
 Swarm of the Lotus
 Twilight Transmission
 Walk the Line
 When Tigers Fight

Sunday, August 21 *

Main Stage A: 1x1 Music 

 As I Lay Dying
 The Banner
 Between the Buried and Me
 Comeback Kid
 From Autumn to Ashes
 Haste the Day
 It Dies Today
 Killswitch Engage
 The Red Chord
 Throwdown

Main Stage B: Peta2 

 Anti-Flag
 The Casualties
 Emery
 Norma Jean
 Remembering Never
 Rise Against
 Silverstein
 Stretch Arm Strong
 Symphony in Peril

Outdoor Stage A: Goodfellow Records/Abacus Recordings 

 The Beautiful Mistake
 Bedlight for Blue Eyes
 The Chariot
 The End
 The Esoteric
 Kane Hodder
 The Loved Ones
 Psyopus
 The Red Death
 Sinai Beach
 Still Remains
 Today Is the Day

Outdoor Stage B: Eulogy Recordings 

 A Hero From a Thousand Paces
 The Acacia Strain
 The Agony Scene
 The A.K.A.s
 Anterrabae
 Calico System
 Death Before Dishonor
 Ion Dissonance
 Roses Are Red
 The Showdown
 Spitfire
 Tension

Outdoor Stage C: Hot Topic 

 2 Cents
 A Murder of Crows
 At All Cost
 Between Walls
 Bled Across Miles
 Bloodjinn
 Bloodlined Calligraphy
 Cold War
 FC Five
 Final Word
 Horse The Band
 I Am Idaho
 The Last Season
 Life in Pictures
 Look What I Did
 Outbreak
 Ramallah
 Scary Kids Scaring Kids
 Silhouette
 The Tony Danza Tapdance Extravaganza

Notes 
* Hellfest '05 was cancelled and none of the concerts were played. The schedule above was the one announced prior to the cancellation and is presented here for preservation.

This was the first event to feature five stages on each day.

Discrepancies between Paper Street Music (Hellfest's organizer and promoter) and the venue caused the event to be cancelled less than thirty-six hours before starting. A number of the bands originally scheduled for Hellfest planned last-minute alternative shows in the Tri-State Region. Several threats of lawsuits were announced in the news, from the promoters, the venue, the bands and the fans who had not been refunded for their tickets, but so far none have made it to court.

Hellfest Battle of the Bands 
In 2004, Hellfest sponsored an official battle of the bands contests, both nationally and in Central New Jersey, giving the chance to unsigned bands the opportunity of playing the festival's stages. New Jersey bands were required to enter the local competition organized by concert promoter Excess dB Entertainment, while national acts could apply through //radiotakover's competition.

Excess dB Entertainment's Hellfest Battle of the Bands 
The Excess dB Entertainment Battle of the Bands contest offered a total of fifteen prizes: nine Hellfest playing slots for first-place winners and six Excess dB Entertainment concert playing slots for second and third-place winners. The competition was held over three days, two at Club Krome in New Brunswick, New Jersey, and one at Cricket Club in Irvington, New Jersey. Five winners were picked at the end of each event by a selection of judges from the New Jersey hardcore community. The judges were Carl Severson (owner of Ferret Music), Alex Saavedra (owner of Eyeball Records), Josh Grabelle (owner of Trustkill Records), Fred Feldman (owner of Triple Crown Records), Kyle Kraszewski (owner of No Milk Records), Joanna Angel (owner of BurningAngels), Andrew D. Keller (A&R scout at Columbia Records), Michelle and Stacy (writers at The Aquarian Weekly), DJ Rob, DJ Ralph and DJ Q (disc jockeys at WSOU), Geoff Rickly (vocalist of the band Thursday) and Evange Livanos (promoter at FATA Booking).

The bands Endwell, Malice Aforethought, Flat Earth Society, Nothing Left to Mourn, The Dead Season, Breath of Silence, Sycamore Dreams, Nag Hamadi and Starting to Wonder all won first place and played at Hellfest 2004. Endwell, Nothing Left to Mourn, Breath of Silence and Sycamore Dreams played on the Hot Topic Stage, while Malice Aforethought, Flat Earth Society, The Dead Season, Nag Hamadi and Starting to Wonder played on the Dinosaur Stage.

June 13, 2004: Club Krome Battle of the Bands 1

Main Room 

 Away from it All
 Blind Hate Experiment
 Blood of a Prophet
 Burnt to Ashes
 The Death of a Celebrity
 Euclid
 Forgetting Tomorrow
 Gray Lines of Perfection
 Last to Fall
 The Lionel Crush
 Lost in Silence
 Muk Cage
 Nag Hamadi
 No Tactics
 One Step Away
 Stafford
 Sycamore Dreams
 Tears Shall Fall
 Well Kept Secret
 The Years Gone By
 Zamora

Lounge 

 7 Inch Furniture
 A Faint Farewell
 And Tragedy Struck
 All for Nothing
 Between Love and Murder
 Broken View
 Deny All
 First Born Death
 Forrester
 Funeral Not a Fight
 Hellfire Kansas
 Left to Die
 Minotar
 No Longer Silent
 Quantice Never Crashed
 xSPINKICKx
 Starting to Wonder
 Strike 4
 Twilight City Fracture
 Undying Morals
 The Wake

June 19, 2004: Cricket Club Battle of the Bands

Upstairs Room 

 A Dying Declaration
 A Match Like Memory
 Above All Hope
 Athens Is Burning
 The Closest Point to Nowhere
 The Dead Season
 Ehrhardt
 Fall of the Sacred
 For the Sake of Dying
 Last Will
 Moira
 No Dice
 Nothing Left to Mourn
 Sacred Hatred
 Sanctify
 Shattering Elysium
 Smalltown Tragedy
 Social Suicide
 Strength in Numbers
 The Style
 This Means Everything
 Turncoat

Downstairs Room 

 A True Story
 Breath of Silence
 Catatonic
 Choke Powder
 Dead End Saints
 Death By Names
 Divinity Condemned
 Divulgence
 Evelyn Hope
 Iced Over Phoenix
 Killed by Memories
 Novelty Tag
 Quick Kill Formula
 Red Skies
 Robots Are Good Lovers
 Sarins Gift
 The Smash Up
 Sky Set Unfold
 The Sleep Process
 Slipping to Death
 Twicethecreator
 Wait Until Dark

June 27, 2004: Club Krome Battle of the Bands 2

Main Room 

 A Fallen Day
 Ashes to Mourn
 Before I Burn
 Bleed the Rose
 Broadway
 Broken Word
 Death to Honor
 Defire
 Drive By
 Endwell
 Evelyn Adali
 Flat Earth Society
 The Homicide Blueprint
 Karmacide
 Lines of Hatred
 Lucked Out
 Rally Days
 Red Hill
 Screaming for Silence
 Sicks Deep
 Through Dead Eyes
 Twizted Mindz
 Undercut
 Waiting on Wendy

Lounge 

 Amnion
 Avatar
 Black Sand and Starless Nights
 The Color of War
 The Concubine
 Dead 2 Rights
 Eight is Enough
 Had This Day Not Been
 Hari-Kari
 The Inbetween
 Leviathan
 Life No Longer
 Machete for Hands
 Malice Aforethought
 Moraine
 One Brick Down
 Open Your Eyes
 Self Explanatory
 Send 72
 Soundtrack of Your Life
 State of The Art
 Through a Windshield
 Torn to Shreds
 Words on a Page

//radiotakover's Hellfest Battle of the Bands 
The //radiotakeover Battle of the Bands contest was sponsored by Hot Topic, Revolver, Hopeless Records and Trustkill Records. Instead of hosting live shows and judging the bands by their live performances, this Battle of the Bands was hosted digitally with artists submitting pre-recorded songs to //radiotakover's website using a user-based voting system. Bands were required to pay a $5 entry fee and submit their songs between May 7–14, 2004; but due to an overwhelming response, the deadline was extended to June 21, 2004. The eleven top-voted bands were selected on June 21, 2004, and presented to a judging panel of industry professionals (likely the same judges from Excess dB Entertainment's Battle of the Bands). The judging panel had four days to select the winners, based on a single song, which were scheduled to be announced on Friday, June 25, 2004, but was delayed to Monday, June 28, 2004. The Grand Prize winner was given a slot on Hellfest's main stage, accommodations and expenses for the weekend of the event, as well as inclusion on the documentary DVD scheduled to be released by HighRoller Studios (which was ultimately shelved). First Prize winners received slots on Hellfest's Hot Topic stage, free passes to attend the event and free Hellfest merchandise, but were required to provide their own accommodations. Runner up winners (Second Place and Third Place winners) received free passes to attend the event and free Hellfest merchandise.

Winners 
The list of winners was announced along with the selected songs upon which they were judged. The top four bands were given playing spots at Hellfest 2004; the Grand Prize winner on the Main Stage, and the three First Prize winners on the Hot Topic Stage.

Home media releases 

All Hellfest events have been filmed, either by fans or by professional production companies. However, only three official VHS/DVDs have been released.

Hellfest Syracuse, NY - Summer 2000: The Official Documentary 
Hellfest Syracuse, NY - Summer 2000: The Official Documentary was the first officially released video recording of 2000's Hellfest 2K. It was released on VHS and DVD by Trustkill Records on June 12, 2001, and features live footage, interviews, commentaries by fifteen bands, the majority of which were already signed to Trustkill Records.

Track listing 
Credits are adapted from the VHS/DVD's liner notes.

Personnel 

 Doug Spangenberg – director, editor
 Josh Grabelle – executive producer, layout, design
 John McKaig – photography
 Jessica Lynn – photography
 Jon Tumillo – photography

Hellfest 2002 
(2 discs) (released January 6, 2004):

Featuring live performances from Coheed and Cambria, Bleeding Through, Hatebreed, Merauder, NORA, Open Hand, Freya, Throwdown, Lamb of God, Bloodlet, Eighteen Visions, Most Precious Blood, Terror, Death Threat and more.

Hellfest Vol III: Official Video Documentary Filmed Live At Hellfest 2003 In Syracuse 
(2 discs) (released July 13, 2004):

Featuring live performances from Anti-Flag, Thursday, The Dillinger Escape Plan, Norma Jean, Lamb of God, Murder By Death, Walls of Jericho, The Bled, Terror, From Autumn to Ashes, CKY, Comeback Kid, My Chemical Romance, Full Blown Chaos, The Locust, Biohazard, Unearth, Bleeding Through, Bouncing Souls and more.

Hellfest's final year, the 2004 weekend at Rexplex, Elizabeth, New Jersey was filmed by High Roller Studios to be released on DVD, but the footage was never released publicly. When High Roller Studios ended, their MySpace page (www.myspace.com/highrollerstudios) explained the company's reason for disbanding, adding that the Hellfest DVD would never be released. Unbeknownst to most, the entire 2004 DVD had been edited and was ready for release, however Radiotakeover president Shawn Van Der Poel had failed to negotiate agreements with the bands that would have appeared on the multi-disc set.

Director Doug Spangenberg and editor Anderson Bradshaw went on to form a new video production company (Space Monkey Studios, Inc.).

Hellfest 2001/2004 Resurrection (July 2013):

In the summer of 2013, Doug Spangenberg gave the surviving tapes from Hellfests 2001 and 2004 to hate5six so that the sets could be properly edited and released to the public for free. This long-term project promises to make the "lost" footage available in an ad-free and non-commercial setting.

References

External links
One ‘Hell’ of a concert, Report by Scott Frost, The Trentonian
 Cold day in hell, by Scott Frost, The Trentonian
Article in The New York Times about the demise of the festival in 2005. Registration required.

Heavy metal festivals in the United States
Music festivals established in 1997
Music festivals disestablished in 2005
Punk rock festivals
Music festivals in New York (state)
Music festivals in New Jersey
Music organizations based in the United States
Rock festivals in the United States